In programming languages, name binding is the association of entities (data and/or code) with identifiers. An identifier bound to an object is said to reference that object. Machine languages have no built-in notion of identifiers, but name-object bindings as a service and notation for the programmer is implemented by programming languages. Binding is intimately connected with scoping, as scope determines which names bind to which objects – at which locations in the program code (lexically) and in which one of the possible execution paths (temporally).

In all other occurrences (e.g., in expressions, assignments, and subprogram calls), an identifier stands for what it is bound to; such occurrences are called applied occurrences.

Binding time
 Static binding (or early binding) is name binding performed before the program is run.
 Dynamic binding (or late binding or virtual binding) is name binding performed as the program is running.

An example of a static binding is a direct C function call: the function referenced by the identifier cannot change at runtime.

An example of dynamic binding is dynamic dispatch, as in a C++ virtual method call. Since the specific type of a polymorphic object is not known before runtime (in general), the executed function is dynamically bound. Take, for example, the following Java code:

public void foo(java.util.List<String> list) {
    list.add("bar");
}

List is an interface, so list must refer to a subtype of it. list may reference a LinkedList, an ArrayList, or some other subtype of List. The method referenced by add is not known until runtime. In C, such an instance of dynamic binding may be a call to a function pointed to by a variable or expression of a function pointer type whose value is unknown until it is evaluated at run-time.

Rebinding and mutation
Rebinding should not be confused with mutation.

 Rebinding is a change to the referencing identifier.
 Mutation is a change to the referenced entity.

Consider the following Java code:

LinkedList<String> list;
list = new LinkedList<String>();
list.add("foo");
list = null;

The identifier list initially references nothing (it is uninitialized); it is then rebound to reference an object (a linked list of strings). The linked list referenced by list is then mutated, adding a string to the list. Lastly, list is rebound to null.

Late static
Late static binding is a variant of binding somewhere between static and dynamic binding.  Consider the following PHP example:
class A
{
    public static $word = "hello";
    public static function hello() { print self::$word; }
}

class B extends A
{
    public static $word = "bye";
}

B::hello();

In this example, the PHP interpreter binds the keyword self inside A::hello() to class A, and so the call to B::hello() produces the string "hello". If the semantics of self::$word had been based on late static binding, then the result would have been "bye".

Beginning with PHP version 5.3, late static binding is supported.  Specifically, if self::$word in the above were changed to static::$word as shown in the following block, where the keyword static would only be bound at runtime, then the result of the call to B::hello() would be "bye":

class A
{
    public static $word = "hello";
    public static function hello() { print static::$word; }
}

class B extends A
{
    public static $word = "bye";
}

B::hello();

See also
 Late binding
 Branch table method of applying name binding via branch table or function pointers
 Dynamic dispatch
 Higher-order abstract syntax (HOAS)

References

Programming language concepts
Articles with example Java code
Definition

ja:束縛 (情報工学)
pt:Vinculação de nomes (computação)